Black snake may refer to:

Snakes
 Agkistrodon piscivorus, a.k.a. the cottonmouth, a pitviper species found in North America
 Coluber constrictor, a colubrid species found in North America
 Crotalus oreganus, a.k.a. the Northern Pacific rattlesnake, a rattlesnake species found in North America
 Pantherophis alleghaniensis, Pantherophis obsoletus, and Pantherophis spiloides, a.k.a. the black (or gray) rat snake or the pilot black snake, three colubrid snake species found in North America
 Pseudechis, a genus of elapids snakes found in Australia

Other
 A type of whip
 Black snake (firework), a type of firework
 Governor Blacksnake (1760–1859), a Seneca chief also known as Chainbreaker
 Black Snake (Shawnee), a leader in the defeat of Colonel William Crawford's army during the Crawford expedition of 1782
 Black Snake (film), made in 1973 and directed by Russ Meyer
 Black Snake, Kentucky

Animal common name disambiguation pages